Pucciniastrum coryli is a fungal plant pathogen infecting hazelnuts. It forms ochraceous rust pustules on the leaves. Also commonly known as hazel rust.

It is known to affect Corylus sieboldiana, Corylus colurna and Corylus heterophylla.

References

Fungal tree pathogens and diseases
Hazelnut tree diseases
Pucciniales
Fungi described in 1899